The 1925 Currie Cup was the 14th edition of the Currie Cup, the premier domestic rugby union competition in South Africa.

See also

 Currie Cup

References

1925
1925 in South African rugby union
Currie